Michael Fedderson (December 7, 1940 – January 28, 2016), known as Mike Minor, was an American actor best known for his role as Steve Elliott on Petticoat Junction (1966–1970).

Early life
Minor was born on December 7, 1940, in San Francisco to newspaper advertising man Don Fedderson, who would later become a leading television producer, and Helen Macie "Tido" Minor.

He began voice lessons in 1953 at the age of 13. His first singing job was at Ye Little Club in Beverly Hills, where he was engaged for two weeks and held over for ten. He attended University High School in Los Angeles and Brown Military Academy in San Diego. After that he appeared at Bimbo's 365 Club in San Francisco, the Rat Fink Room in New York City, the Elegante in Brooklyn, Izzy's Supper Club in Vancouver and the Beverly Hilton Hotel in Los Angeles.

Career

Television
In 1961, Minor played the character Ray in an episode of My Three Sons, a show produced by his father. Before he played Steve Elliott on Petticoat Junction in seasons four through seven (1966–70), two years earlier, Mike Minor played as Dan Plout, the son of Kate rival Selma Plout who Kate thought older daughter Billie Jo was going to marry in 11 episode of the second season (Mother Of The Bride, December 15, 1964). 
Two years later, in the second show of season four, Elliott, a pilot, crashed his airplane in Hooterville, then recovered and eventually married the character Betty Jo Bradley, though two seasons earlier, he portrayed the character of Dan Plout, and married a friend of Billie Jo’s in an episode titled “Mother of the Bride” which aired on December 15, 1964. Seasons 6 and 7 of the series focused on the newlywed couple of Betty Jo and Steve, and their newborn daughter Kathy Jo Elliott. Many sources erroneously reported that Minor sang the series' title song; in fact, it was sung by Curt Massey, the series' music composer, who co-wrote the song with show creator and producer Paul Henning.

Among Minor's other television credits were The Donald O'Connor Show (1968 version), The Beverly Hillbillies, CHiPs, Vega$, and L.A. Law.

In the 1970s, Minor made brief appearances on daytime shows The Edge of Night and As the World Turns. In the 1980s, he appeared as Brandon Kingsley on All My Children (1980–1982) and as Dr. Royal Dunning on Another World (1983–1984).

Stage
In 1968, Minor made his stage debut, playing the romantic lead in The Impossible Years with Ozzie and Harriet Nelson.

Music
Minor recorded two albums, including This Is Mike Minor (1966), and numerous singles, including the successful "Silver Dollar" and "One Day at a Time".

Minor sang the theme song ("Primrose Lane") on season one of the Henry Fonda television series The Smith Family.

Personal life
Minor's childhood ambition was to be a professional baseball player, but when he matured he switched to golf. He was a member of the Hollywood Hackers, an organization of show-biz golfers who travel around the country playing at choice golf courses and entertaining the spectators. On July 22, 1961, Minor married Monyeen Rae Martini; the couple had one son but the marriage ended in divorce.

On September 7, 1968, he married Linda Kaye Henning, who played Betty Jo on Petticoat Junction, following a romance that began on the set.  A year before their real-life wedding, they were married in the television series. They divorced five years later and had no children. Minor married Marilyn Minor in 1981.

Death
Minor died of cancer on January 28, 2016, at age 75.

References

External links
 

1940 births
2016 deaths
American male pop singers
American male soap opera actors
American male television actors
Male actors from California
Musicians from California
University High School (Los Angeles) alumni
Deaths from cancer in New York (state)